Bornish is a village and community council area on South Uist in the Outer Hebrides, Scotland. Bornish is also within the civil parish of South Uist. The A865 passes through Bornish, on the route between Lochmaddy and Lochboisdale.

History
The construction of nearby Dun Vulan broch has been dated to the period 150–50 BC. A Pictish house was later built within the walls.

Excavations of a Norse settlement nearby have provided important information about lifestyles during this period. It suggests that pigs were a more important aspect of Viking farming than prior to that time, that red deer numbers may have been "controlled" rather than the species simply being subject to hunting, that herring fishing became an important commercial consideration and that trade with centres to the south such as Dublin and Bristol may have been important. Coins found at Bornais and nearby Cille Pheadair were produced in Norway, Westphalia,  and England, although there were none from Scotland. Ivory from Greenland was also found there.

It is known that Hebrides were taxed using the Ounceland system and evidence from Bornais suggests that settlers there may have been more prosperous than families of a similar status in the Northern Isles, possibly due to a more relaxed political regime.

References

 Sharples, Niall and Smith, Rachel "Norse settlement in the Western Isles" in Woolf, Alex (ed.) (2007) Scandinavian Scotland – Twenty Years After. St Andrews. St Andrews University Press.

External links

Canmore – South Uist, Bornish House site record
Canmore – South Uist, Bornish, St Mary's Roman Catholic Church site record

Villages on South Uist